Tightrope walking is the art of walking along a thin wire or rope.

Tightrope or Tight rope may also refer to:

Entertainment

Film and television
 Tightrope (film), a 1984 film starring Clint Eastwood
 Tightrope (1960 film), a French drama film
 Tightrope!, a 1959–60 American television series starring Mike Connors
 Tightrope Pictures, British television production company

Albums
 Tight Rope (album), 1999
 Tightrope (EP), an EP by American rock band Walk the Moon
 Tightrope (Steve Khan album), a 1977 album by Steve Khan
 Tightrope (Stephanie McIntosh album), 2006
 Tightrope, a 1986 album by Anthem
 Tightrope, a 1993 live album by the Irish rock band The Stunning

Songs
 "Tight Rope" (song), a 1972 song by Leon Russell
 "Tightrope" (Electric Light Orchestra song), 1976
 "Tightrope" (Illy song), 2014
 "Tightrope" (Janelle Monáe song), 2010
 "Tightrope" (Stephanie McIntosh song), 2006
 "Tightrope" (Walk the Moon song), 2012
 "Tightrope", from the album Lost on You by LP
 "Tightrope", from the album Minus the Machine by 10 Years
 "Tightrope", B-side from CD single "In Your Eyes" by Kylie Minogue
 "Tightrope", hidden track from the album Infest by Papa Roach
 "Tightrope", from the album Prisoner by Ryan Adams
 "Tightrope", from the album In Step by Stevie Ray Vaughan
 "Tightrope", from the album Second Coming by The Stone Roses
 "Tightrope", from the compilation album Dark Was the Night by Yeasayer
 "Tight Rope", from the album Around the Sun by Jeff Watson
 "Tight Rope", from the album Comalies by Lacuna Coil

Other
 Tightrope (novel), a 1999 children's book by Gillian Cross
 Tightrope Books, a Canadian independent book publisher based in Toronto
 Tightrope Walker (sculpture), a 1979 bronze sculpture by Dutch artist Kees Verkade
 Tightrope, a 2015 novel by Simon Mawer
 Tightrope, part of Operation Dominic I and II, the last atmospheric nuclear test by the United States, in 1962
 The Tight Rope, a podcast